The Spalding Tournament was a professional golf tournament played in the United Kingdom. It was played annually from 1946 to 1960. The total prize money was £1500 in 1946, £1250 in 1947 and 1948, £1350 from 1949 to 1959 and £2250 in 1960. The event was sponsored by A.G. Spalding & Brothers.

From 1954 the Spalding Tournament moved to April and replaced the Silver King Tournament as the season opening event. The Silver King Tournament had been played at Moor Park from 1936 to 1953.

Winners

References

Golf tournaments in England
Recurring sporting events established in 1946
Recurring sporting events disestablished in 1960
1946 establishments in England
1960 disestablishments in England